Pallarcocha or Pallacocha (possibly from Quechua palla, dame, lady, mature woman of the Inca nobility, and qucha, lake,) is a small lake in Peru located in the Arequipa Region, Condesuyos Province, Andaray District.

References 

Lakes of Peru
Lakes of Arequipa Region